Jogi may refer to:

Art and entertainment
Jogi (2005 film), a Kannada film
"Jogi" (Panjabi MC song), 2003
"Jogi" (The Sketches song), a song by Pakistani Sufi-rock band The Sketches
"Jogi", a main song performed by Arko featuring Yasser Desai & Aakanksha Sharma from the soundtrack of the Indian film Shaadi Mein Zaroor Aana
 Jogi (2022 film), a Hindi film

Other uses 
Yogi, or jogi, a yoga practitioner
Yogi Nath, a Shaivism-related group of monks
Jogi (caste), a major Hindu social group of South Asia
Jogi Faqir, a Muslim community of South Asia
Jogi (Afghanistan), one of the peripatetic groups of Afghanistan
Jogi language, an Indo-Aryan language of India and Pakistan

People with the name
Jõgi, Estonian surname (including people with the name)
Ajit Jogi (born 1946), Indian politician
Amit Jogi (born 1977), Indian politician, Ajit's son
Jogi Ram Sihag, Indian politician
Renu Jogi, Indian politician elected to the Chhattisgarh Legislative Assembly
Santhosh Jogi (1974/1975 – 2010), Malayalee film actor and singer
Sunil Jogi (born 1971), Indian author and poet and government minister in Uttar Pradesh

See also
 Jogi-jeot (조기젓), a side dish in Korean cuisine
Yogi (disambiguation)
Yoga (disambiguation)